Glenwood may refer to:

Places

Canada 
 Glenwood, Alberta (village)
 Glenwood, Alberta (former hamlet)
 Glenwood, Edmonton, a neighbourhood in Edmonton, Alberta
 Glenwood, Manitoba
 Glenwood, Northumberland County, New Brunswick, Canada
 Glenwood, Restigouche County, New Brunswick, Canada
 Glenwood, Newfoundland and Labrador
 Glenwood, Nova Scotia
 Glenwood, Winnipeg

United States 
 Glenwood, Alabama
 Glenwood, Arkansas
 Glenwood, California, Santa Cruz County
 Glenwood Canyon, Colorado
 Glenwood Springs, Colorado
 Glenwood, Florida
 Glenwood, Georgia, a city in Wheeler County
 Glenwood, Floyd County, Georgia, an unincorporated community
 Glenwood, Illinois
 Glenwood, Indiana
 Glenwood, Iowa
 Glenwood Plantation, Maine
 Glenwood, Harford County, Maryland
 Glenwood, Howard County, Maryland
 Glenwood, Minnesota
 Glenwood, Missouri
 Glenwood, Nebraska
 Glenwood Township, Gage County, Nebraska
 Glenwood, New Jersey, part of Vernon Township
 Glenwood, New Mexico
 Glenwood, New York
 Glenwood (Troy, New York), a.k.a. Eddy Titus Mansion, historic home in Rensselaer County
 Glenwood (Metro-North station), commuter rail station in Glenwood, Yonkers, New York
 Glenwood, North Carolina
 Glenwood (Enon, North Carolina)
 Glenwood, Lane County, Oregon
 Glenwood, Washington County, Oregon
 Glenwood, Utah
 Glenwood, Virginia
 Glenwood (South Boston, Virginia), a historic plantation estate 
 Glenwood, Kitsap County, Washington
 Glenwood, Klickitat County, Washington
 Glenwood, Whitman County, Washington
 Glenwood, Mason County, West Virginia
 Glenwood, Mercer County, West Virginia
 Glenwood, Wisconsin
 Glenwood City, Wisconsin
 Glenwood Park, Atlanta, Georgia

Other countries 
 Glenwood, New South Wales, Australia
 Glenwood, Queensland, Australia
 Glenwood, KwaZulu-Natal, a suburb of Durban, South Africa
Glenwood, Glenrothes, Fife, Scotland
Glenwood, a former council ward covering parts of Castlemilk, Glasgow, Scotland

Games 
 Glenwood (card game), a patience or solitaire also known as Duchess.

Literature 
Rex Morgan, M.D.#Story and characters

See also
Glenwood Cemetery
Glenwood Historic District (disambiguation)